The term post-democracy was used by Warwick University political scientist Colin Crouch in 2000 in his book Coping with Post-Democracy. It designates states that operate by democratic systems (elections are held, governments fall, and there is freedom of speech), but whose application is progressively limited. A small elite is taking the tough decisions and co-opts the democratic institutions. Crouch further developed the idea in an article called Is there a liberalism beyond social democracy? for the think tank Policy Network and in his subsequent book The Strange Non-Death of Neo-Liberalism.

The term may also denote a general conception of a post-democratic system that may involve other structures of group decision-making and governance than the ones found in contemporary or historical democracy.

Definition 
By Crouch's definition:

Crouch states that we are not "living in a post-democratic society, but that we were moving towards such a condition".

Causes 
Crouch names the following reasons:
 No common goals: For people in the post-industrial society it is increasingly difficult, in particular for the underclass, to identify themselves as a group and therefore difficult to focus on political parties that represent them. For instance laborers, farmers or entrepreneurs no longer feel attracted to one political movement and this means that there is no common goal for them as a group to get united.
 Globalization: The effect of globalization makes it almost impossible for nations to work out their own economic policy. Therefore, large trade agreements and supranational unions (e.g., the European Union) are used to make policy but this level of politics is very hard to control with democratic instruments. Globalization additionally endows transnational corporations with more political leverage given their ability to avoid federal regulation and directly affect domestic economies.  
 Non-balanced debates: In most democratic countries the positions of the political parties have become very much alike. This means that there is not much to choose from for its voters. The effect is that political campaigns are looking more like advertising to make the differences look bigger. Also the private lives of the politicians have become an important item in elections. Sometimes "sensitive" issues stay undiscussed. The English conservative journalist Peter Oborne presented a documentary of the 2005 general election, arguing that it had become anti-democratic because it targeted a number of floating voters with a narrow agenda.
 Entanglement between public and private sector: There are large shared interests between politics and business. Through lobbying companies, multinational corporations are able to bring about legislation more effectively than the inhabitants of a country. Corporations and governments are in close relation because states need corporations as they are great employers. But as much of the production is outsourced, and corporations have almost no difficulty in moving to other countries, labor law becomes employee-unfriendly and tax bites are moved from companies to individuals. It becomes more common for politicians and managers to switch jobs (the 'revolving door').
 Privatization: Then there is the neoliberal idea of new public management (neoliberalism) of privatizing public services. Privatized institutions are difficult to control by democratic means and have no allegiance to human communities, unlike government. Crouch uses the term “phantom firms” to describe the flexibility and elusive nature of firms which bend to the market. He concludes that private firms have incentive to make individual profit rather than better the welfare of the public. For example, he states that there is a problem with pharmaceutical companies funding (and skewing) medical research.

The United States 
In recent years, the United States has experienced an unprecedented amount of democratic backsliding for a developed, liberal democracy. The pursuit of populist agendas has caused a breakdown in public faith in the government, which showed when Freedom House published their annual index in 2021, and the United States lost three points overall, dropping from an 86 to an 83. This idea of countries like the United States failing to live up to democratic ideals is not new. In 2009, Stein Ringen argued that the U.S., along with the United Kingdom, faces an increasingly mistrustful public, which is reinforced by the role that money plays in deciding what issues are tackled by the federal government, especially while so many citizens face poverty and disenfranchisement. This idea is only maintained by William Galston, who asserts that liberal democracy is and always will be vulnerable, specifically to nationalist interests. Nothing can eradicate these vulnerabilities, they can only be minimized by "wise leadership" which the United States lacked when it mattered most.

Solutions 

According to Crouch there is an important task for social media in which voters can participate more actively in public debates. In addition, these voters would have to join advocacy groups for specific interests. The citizens have to reclaim their place in decision making. He calls this post-post-democracy.

The Occupy movement was a form of more or less disorganized opposition that grew out of the dissatisfaction with to the power of the banking industry.

Belgian historian David van Reybrouck describes in his book Against elections the current problems in Western democracy as the democratic fatigue syndrome. As a solution he advocates a deliberative democracy based on sortition.

See also

References 

 Interview with Colin Crouch about post-democracy on YouTube (mainly in English)
Verma, Ravindra Kumar "Indian Politics: Haunted by Spectre of Post Democracy?", Indian Journal of Public Administration/SAGE, 63(4), December 2017

Further reading
 Colin Crouch: Post Democracy, 2004, 
 Jenny Hocking & Colleen Lewis: Counter-Terrorism and the Post-Democratic State, 2008,

External links
 On Coping with "Post Democracy". By Ernest Partridge. "The Online Gadfly", January, 2001.
  La emancipación según Jacques Rancière.
  There is no Alternative by Henry Farrell.
 Why We Need A More Substantive European Democracy, by Colin Crouch. Social Europe, 20 August 2014.

Political science
Democracy
2000s neologisms
Elite theory
Oligarchy